Koi is a "salad" dish of the Lao people living in modern-day Laos and Isan, Thailand, consisting of raw meat denatured by acidity, usually from lime juice. Common varieties include koi kung, with shrimp as the main ingredient, and koi paa/koi pla, which consists of minced or finely chopped raw fish in spicy salad dressing. 

Koi can be a source of parasitic diseases. Koi made with raw fish is a popular dish in Laos and Isaan and a common source of infection with the Southeast Asian liver fluke Opisthorchis viverrini.

Koi pla eaten in north-east Thailand is made from raw fish, live red ants, herbs and lime juice. Koi pla is eaten soon after it is prepared, without a long period of soaking in acid juice. It is believed to be a cause of cholangiocarcinoma via liver fluke transmission.

Koi hoi is a dish containing raw snail meat that has been associated with human infection with parasitic flatworms or liver flukes that infect the snail.  Liver fluke infection is the cause of bile duct cancer, the infection may also account for more than 50 percent of cancers diagnosed in men in this region, compared to just 10 percent globally. Liver infection is also caused by the rat lungworm Angiostrongylus cantonensis.

See also 
 Gỏi 
 Lao cuisine
 Larb
 List of salads
 Thai salad
 Ceviche

References

External links 
 Luang Prabang Style Koi Fish Salad Recipe
 Vientiane Style Koi Fish Salad Recipe

Thai cuisine
Lao cuisine
Raw fish salads
Potentially dangerous food